Sir David Charles Baulcombe  (born 1952) is a British plant scientist and geneticist.  he is a Royal Society Research Professor. From 2007 to 2020 he was Regius Professor of Botany in the Department of Plant Sciences at the University of Cambridge.

Education 
David Baulcombe was born in Solihull, West Midlands (then Warwickshire). He received his Bachelor of Science degree in botany from the University of Leeds in 1973 at the age of 21. He continued his studies at the University of Edinburgh, where he received his Doctor of Philosophy degree in 1977 for research on Messenger RNA in vascular plants supervised by John Ingle.

Career and research 
After his PhD, Baulcombe spent the following three years as a postdoctoral fellow in North America, first at McGill University (Montreal, Quebec, Canada) from January 1977 to November 1978, and then at the University of Georgia (Athens, Georgia, United States) until December 1980.  Baulcombe returned to the United Kingdom then, where he joined the Plant Breeding Institute (PBI) in Cambridge and started his career as an independent scientist. At the PBI, Baulcombe initially held the position of Higher Scientific Officer, and was promoted to Principal Scientific Officer in April 1986. In August 1988 Baulcombe left Cambridge for Norwich. He joined the Sainsbury Laboratory as a senior research scientist, and also served as head of laboratory between 1990 and 1993 and between 1999 and 2003. In 1998 he was appointed honorary professor at the University of East Anglia, and given a full professorship there in 2002. In March 2007 it was announced that Baulcombe would become the next Professor of Botany at Cambridge University as a Royal Society Research Professor, taking up his post in September 2007. In 2009, the position was renamed "Regius Professor of Botany". In 2020 he was succeeded by Ottoline Leyser.

He serves on several committees and study sections, was elected Member of the European Molecular Biology Organisation in 1997 and was president of the International Society of Plant Molecular Biology 2003–2004. , he is also a senior advisor for The EMBO Journal. He also served on the Life Sciences jury for the Infosys Prize in 2015.

Baulcombe's research interests and contributions to science are mainly in the fields of virus movement, genetic regulation, disease resistance, and gene silencing.

With Andrew Hamilton he discovered the small interfering RNA that is the specificity determinant in RNA-mediated gene silencing. Baulcombe's group demonstrated that while viruses can induce gene silencing, some viruses encode proteins that suppress gene silencing. After these initial observations in plants, many laboratories around the world searched for the occurrence of this phenomenon in other organisms. In 1998 Craig Mello and Andrew Fire reported a potent gene silencing effect after injecting double stranded RNA into Caenorhabditis elegans. This discovery was particularly notable because it represented the first identification of the causative agent for the phenomenon. Fire and Mello were awarded the Nobel Prize in Physiology or Medicine in 2006 for their work.

With other members of his research group at the Sainsbury Laboratory, Baulcombe also helped unravel the importance of small interfering RNA in epigenetics and in defence against viruses.

Honours and awards 
In June 2009, Baulcombe was awarded a knighthood by Queen Elizabeth II. Baulcombe resides in Norwich. Baulcombe has also received the following honours and awards:

 1997 elected to EMBO Membership
 2001 elected Fellow of the Royal Society (FRS)
 2002 elected Member of the Academia Europaea
 2002 recipient of the Ruth Allen Award, awarded by the American Phytopathological Society
 2002 recipient of the Kumho Science International Award in Plant Molecular Biology and Biotechnology, awarded by the Kumho Cultural Foundation, Korea
 2003 co-recipient (with Craig Mello, Andrew Fire and Thomas Tuschl) of the Wiley Prize in the Biomedical Sciences, awarded by Rockefeller University
 2004 recipient of the M. W. Beijerinck Virology Prize, awarded by the Royal Netherlands Academy of Arts and Sciences
 2005 elected Foreign Associate Member of the National Academy of Sciences
 2005 co-recipient (with Craig Mello and Andrew Fire) of the Massry Prize, awarded by the Massry Foundation and the University of Southern California
 2006 recipient of the Royal Society's Royal Medal
 2008 co-recipient of the Benjamin Franklin Medal in Life Science, awarded by the Franklin Institute
 2008 co-recipient (with Victor Ambros and Gary Ruvkun) of the Albert Lasker Award for Basic Medical Research
 2008 appointed Fellow of Trinity College, Cambridge
 2009 knighted by Queen Elizabeth II in the 2009 Birthday Honours List for services to plant science.
 2009 recipient of the Harvey Prize, granted by the Technion Israeli Institute for Technology.
 2010 recipient of the Wolf Prize in Agriculture.
 2012 Balzan Prize for Epigenetics
 2014 Gruber Prize in Genetics
 2015 elected Honorary Fellow of the Royal Society of Edinburgh

Baulcombe's nomination for the Royal Society reads

Personal life
Baulcombe is married and has four children. His interests include music, sailing and hill walking.

References 

Living people
1952 births
British geneticists
British botanists
Scientists from Norwich
Knights Bachelor
Royal Medal winners
Fellows of the Royal Society
Fellows of Trinity College, Cambridge
Foreign associates of the National Academy of Sciences
Academics of the University of East Anglia
Recipients of the Albert Lasker Award for Basic Medical Research
Wolf Prize in Agriculture laureates
Alumni of the University of Edinburgh
Alumni of the University of Leeds
Fellows of the Academy of Medical Sciences (United Kingdom)
Members of Academia Europaea
Massry Prize recipients
Regius Professors of Botany (Cambridge)
Professors of Botany (Cambridge)